Alliance Margaret M. Bloomfield High School is a public charter school located in Huntington Park, California.

External links 
 http://www.bloomfieldhs.org/, the official site

High schools in Los Angeles County, California